Capperia loranus is a moth of the family Pterophoridae. It is found in Spain, France, Belgium, Germany, Italy, Austria, the Czech Republic and Slovakia.

The wingspan is 15–17 mm.

The larvae feed on cut-leaved germander (Teucrium botrys).

References

External links
lepiforum.de

Oxyptilini
Moths described in 1895
Plume moths of Europe